Miles Sampa is a Zambian politician and current Member of Parliament for Matero Constituency. The veteran politician previously served as Mayor of Lusaka, having been elected in August 2018. His election in 2021 would see him return to Parliament representing Matero Constituency, a position he served from 2011 to 2016. 

After the death of Michael Sata, the Fifth President of the Republic of Zambia, who was Sampa's uncle, Sampa was elected as President of the Patriotic Front at a controversial Patriotic Front general party conference. His election was later deemed illegal by the High Court of Zambia, and Defense Minister Edgar Lungu, who would later be elected President of Zambia, was declared the rightful president of the PF. Sampa was later appointed as Deputy Minister of Commerce in Edgar Lungu's government. He resigned and quit the Patriotic Front shortly before the 2016 general election.

Sampa attempted to form a party named Democratic Front, but the name already belonged to another party. After deliberating and searching for a party name, he founded the United Democratic Front (UDF). Sampa entered alliances with Elis Chipimo's NAREP and Eric Chanda's 4th Revolution Party, before eventually throwing his weight behind Hakainde Hichilema and the UPND. After the UPND lost the election, Sampa attempted to rejoin the PF.

References

Living people
Members of the National Assembly of Zambia
Patriotic Front (Zambia) politicians
Year of birth missing (living people)